Shrike is a racing car developed in Australia by the students of the Croydon Park Institute of TAFE in Adelaide in 1988 and 1989. It was developed for the then new Formula Holden category which mandated an aluminium tub monocoque, powered by a Buick sourced 3.8 litre Holden V6 engine, as used in the Holden VN Commodore at that time. The car proved to be instantly competitive in the Australian Drivers' Championship against designs from Elfin (another Adelaide based company), Cheetah, and imported Formula 3000 chassis such as Ralt and Reynard.

Adelaide based driver Mark Poole placed second in the 1990 Australian Drivers' Championship at the wheel of a Clipsal sponsored Shrike. Poole won Round 3 of the championship at Sydney's tight Amaroo Park circuit, as well as Round 6 at the fast Sandown Raceway in Melbourne, proving that the car could win on almost any type of circuit. Poole went into the final round of the series at the 1990 Australian Grand Prix meeting at the Adelaide Street Circuit only one point behind Ralt driver Simon Kane. However, a DNF for the Shrike due to a holed radiator handed the title to Kane who finished the race in second place behind Channel 7 motor sport commentator and series contender Neil Crompton.

Australia's 1987 500cc Grand Prix motorcycle World Champion Wayne Gardner was also to have driven a Shrike in the race at the 1990 AGP, but a qualifying crash into the wall just past the chicane at the end of the pit straight ended his chances. Gardner had spun on coolant that had been dropped by the Ralt RT20 of Drew Price, though he was hopeful of having the car repaired for the race. However his chances ended when another car also spun on the coolant and crashed into the Shrike only moments after Gardner had departed the car and escaped over the outside wall. Prior to his crash, Gardner had qualified in a credible 11th place for his first open wheel drive. Gardner only flew into Adelaide on the day of opening practice (Thursday) after having spent the previous week at Suzuka in Japan testing the Honda NSR500 he was to race in the 1991 500cc World Championship.

Five cars, referred to as the NB89H, were built, and continued to be raced in Formula Holden into the late 1990s.

Complete Formula Holden results 
(key) (results in bold indicate pole position; results in italics indicate fastest lap)

References

Australian racecar constructors
Formula Holden
Cars of Australia